Weverson Moreira da Costa (born 5 July 2000), simply known as Weverson, is a Brazilian footballer who plays as a left-back for Portuguese club Arouca.

Career statistics

References

2000 births
Footballers from Brasília
Living people
Brazilian footballers
Brazil youth international footballers
Association football defenders
São Paulo FC players
Red Bull Bragantino players
F.C. Arouca players
Campeonato Brasileiro Série A players
Primeira Liga players
Brazilian expatriate footballers
Expatriate footballers in Portugal
Brazilian expatriate sportspeople in Portugal